Man or Astro-man? in Orbit is a Man or Astro-man? 7-inch EP released on Shake It Records in 1995. It was released on clear vinyl and black vinyl.  On the record sleeve the band members are listed as "Mission Astronauts" rather than musicians since the title implies that the band will be in orbit.

Track listing

Side A
"Complex 34"
"Alpha Surfari" (The Surfaris)

Side B
"Manta Ray" (The Pixies)
"Space Helmet"

Mission Astronauts
Birdstuff
Coco The Electronic Monkey Wizard
Star Crunch
Captin Zeno

Sources
 

Man or Astro-man? EPs
1995 EPs